Keradeh or Karadeh or Karradeh may refer to:
 Keradeh, Khafr
 Karadeh, Simakan